St John's College was a private day and boarding school located in Southsea, Hampshire, England. It was founded by the De La Salle brothers in 1908. In May 2022, the Governors announced that the school would not re-open for the academic year starting that September, citing declining student numbers, under-investment and the impact of the COVID-19 pandemic as the causes. In August 2022, St John's College appointed administrators and officially went into liquidation. The final head of college at the time of closure was Mary Maguire.

The college has several notable alumni, known as Old Johannians, including the Lord Chief Justice of England and Wales Lord Ian Burnett, England footballer Alex Oxlade-Chamberlain and BBC newsreader George Alagiah.

History
St John's College was founded in Southsea, Portsmouth in 1908 by the De La Salle brothers as an independent boys' school. The founding headmaster was Brother Firme of Quiévy, France. The Catholic De La Salle brothers supported the ethos and ideals of Saint Jean-Baptiste de La Salle, the patron saint of teachers, and the founder of the Institute of the Brothers of the Christian Schools.

St John's moved to its second and final site in 1912. On 28 May 1912, Edmond Brunher, Superior General of the Order, countersigned the conveyance of Grove House (known today as the Castle) and Warleigh House. The college subsequently purchased other properties in its vicinity, settling the entire urban campus. There has been a school chapel on the site since 1913. St John's Gazette was founded in 1915.

During World War One 119 pupils and staff joined the Armed Force. Twelve died in the war. Between 1928 and 1929 the WW1 memorial and St John Baptist De La Salle statue were both unveiled in the college grounds.

An application to the College of Arms for the school crest was granted in the early 1930s. The five pointed star represents the Lasallian Order, the position of St John's by the sea is affirmed by the six waves.

Portsmouth was subjected to many enemy air-raids in World War Two and the college suffered extensive damage. During the war years the college established a sister school in Hassocks, Sussex, where boarders were evacuated away from the bombing in Southsea. Some 53 Johannians died in the war, including 1940–41 school captain and captain of cricket, Lieutenant Edward Fitzgerald.

The Roll of Honour of 1914–18 had a much lengthier list added to it, and a further memorial board to the Old Johannians who lost their lives is now maintained by the school. Every Remembrance Day the names on the memorial are read out by the staff and pupils.

Shortly after the war the college began to rebuild itself, and, in 1945, St John's College sixth form was founded. The school became a Catholic direct grant grammar school under the Education Act 1944 for many years while maintaining its independent status as a member of the Association of Governing Bodies of Public Schools. The site continued to advance from 1958 to 1968 with the opening of the Jubilee block on the college's 50th anniversary. A parent-teacher association was formed in 1962.

Following a trend set by many independent boys' schools, girls were admitted into the sixth form in 1971. The college did not become fully coeducational until 1996. In 2008, St John's celebrated its centenary. On 1 September 2015, the college attained full independent charitable status. In 2018, the college's sixth form was the highest value-added school in the Portsmouth area.

Closure

On 16 May 2022, the Governors of St John's College announced that the school would not re-open in September 2022 due to declining student numbers (from 630 pupils in 2010 to 256 pupils in 2022). Head of College, Mary Maguire, said: 'It is with great sadness that we have to announce the closure of St John's. We are all completely devastated but our governors simply had no choice. We do not have enough pupils to make the school viable.' She said:

It is heartbreaking. We all love this school, and this is the very last thing we would have wanted to happen.' Chair of Governors, Zenna Hopson, said: 'If not for the pandemic and if not for years of chronic under-investment from our landlords we would not be in this situation.' She added: 'We have genuinely done everything we could to try to keep St John’s going but we have reached a point where it is no longer practical. We did hope that the school would be bought, and investment provided for the site to be re-developed and then allowed to continue but this deal fell through. We are desperately sorry, and we are doing all we can to support our pupils, their families and our staff.

The school permanently closed on 14 July 2022 at the end of the summer term for the 2021–22 academic year.

Academic performance
St John's College was an academically strong institution. In 2018, a pass rate of 77% A*-C at A-Level was achieved with multiple individual successes and this resulted in the College's Sixth Form in becoming the highest value-added in the Portsmouth area that year. Also in 2018, an A*-C pass rate of 82% was achieved for GCSE again with multiple individual successes. In 2019, the success continued with multiple 100% pass rates in A-Level subjects  as well as a GCSE A*-C pass rate of 84.5%.

An investigation by the Independent Schools Inspectorate (ISI) carried out between the 25th and 26th January 2017 concluded that "the education the pupils receive, enables the school to fulfil its aims of offering a fully rounded educational experience in all aspects" as well as concluding that "The quality of pupils’ academic and other achievements is good" while "The quality of the pupils’ personal development is excellent". At this time, the College had a total of 577 students on roll according to the report.

Structure
St John's was split into three principal sections: a lower school for children aged between 2 and 9 (reception to year 4); a middle school for pupils aged 9 to 13 (year 5 to year 8) and a senior school for students aged 13 to 18, which includes a sixth form for students studying for their A-Levels. Integral to St John's was a boarding school for students aged 9 to 18 from the UK and overseas.

St John's structured its years into a house system. In the senior school there were four houses: Leo, Edwin, Alan and Damian, all named after notable people who have served as head of college over the years. The college organised inter-house activities such as house 5-a-side matches, house music and house drama. Points were tallied and at the end of each academic year a trophy was awarded to the house with the highest score. Points could also be gained for good behaviour, uniform and manners. An annual speech night and prize giving ceremony took place each summer (with the final three taking place in autumn). A Founders Day service was held each November at St John's Cathedral, Portsmouth.

St John's College and its head-teachers were members of the Independent Schools Council, the Boarding Schools' Association, the Independent Association of Preparatory Schools and the Society of Heads.  St John's College retained its Catholic traditions was an associate member of the Lasallian educational institutions and the De La Salle network of schools, which extends worldwide covering 81 countries from preschool through to universities.

Co-curricular activities
The lower, middle and senior Schools offered extra-curricular activities and after-school clubs. These include a debating club, orchestra clubs, a sailing club, history club, science club, design and tech club, gaming and astronomy GCSE clubs. Some of these clubs could date their history at the college back to the 1920s and 1930s.

Foreign language trips took place in Europe, and each year the college organised a ski-trip for students. The college also had a Duke of Edinburgh Award programme, organising an annual expedition for participating students.

The Politics Society
The Politics Society at St. John's was founded in 1977. The founder, Bernard Black (1934–2013), was head of political studies from 1977 to 1999. Speakers have included Margaret Thatcher, Harold Wilson (former prime minister and previous president of the society), Tony Benn, Enoch Powell, Rowan Williams – former Archbishop of Canterbury,  Douglas Hurd (current President of the Society), Nigel Farage, former Foreign Secretary Jack Straw, former Green Party leader – Caroline Lucas, Theresa May – Home Secretary and subsequently the UK's second woman prime minister; Lord Judge, former Lord Chief Justice; the former Director of Liberty, Shami Chakrabarti; the United States Ambassador to the UK, Matthew Barzun; and Lord Neuberger, former president of the Supreme Court. Meetings are coordinated by Graham Goodlad, head of government and politics at St John's College. On the 10th of June 2022, it was announced that the St John's Politics Society would be transferring to the nearby Portsmouth High School and rebranding itself as the "Portsmouth Politics Society" in light of St John's announcing its closure in May 2022. All meetings originally planned for the rest of 2022 are still scheduled to take place at the new site with their original dates and times.

The Chapel Choir
The St John's College chapel choir can date its roots back to the 1940s when the choir was said to be 50 strong and performed in local churches and Hampshire music festivals, under first the musical direction of John Deegan until 1948 and then Helen Dyer, who remained choir mistress for the next 25 years.

Sport

History
Sporting endeavour has been a feature of life at St John's since its foundation. There has been an annual sports day at St John's College since 1918. For a comparatively small school it has produced a number of notable alumni (see Notable former pupils, below).

Over its history the college has promoted a wide range of sporting opportunities for its students. The diversity of its success has included 1913 Portsmouth Times Rifle Cup and Holbrook Rifle Cup champions; Hampshire Six-a-Side football finalists 1926, 1974, champions 1938, 1947, 1951, 1954, 1964; senior doubles tennis champions, Wimbledon Park Tournament 1951; Southsea Regatta Schools Invitational Rowing Champions 1951, 1952, 1956, 1959; Inter-Schools Cup rowing champions – 14 consecutive years 1953–67; Box Clement Shield for Swimming 1955–56; Portsmouth City Championship for swimming 1956; Serpentine Rowing Champions 1961; Hampshire Rugby Sevens Champions 1965; Public Schools Football Plate winners 1967;  British Orienteering Championships winners 1972; under 14 and under 15 Portsmouth Football League Champions, 1976.

Recent sporting success
In more modern times, the school had a clean-sweep as champions of the under 13, under 14, under 15 and under 16 age-groups of the South East Hampshire Netball League in 2014. This was the fourth consecutive season SJC had won the under 15 league. Also in 2014, the under 18's lifted the Hampshire Rugby plate and in 2015, the under 15's won the rugby NatWest vase. In 2018, the college won the Society of Heads Bowl in rugby 7's. In 2017, the college came third in the senior boys indoor British Independent Schools Ski Championships and in 2018 won the Senior Southern Regional ski competition (u/16). Other notable sporting successes at county level include winning the Hampshire boys hockey tournaments in 2016 (u/13); 2017 (u/13); 2018 (u/13); 2019 (u/14); and 2020 (u/14), with the SJC girls winning the Hampshire County Championships in rounders in 2016 (u/15) and in hockey in 2017 (u/13). The Lower School was the Wessex Prep Schools league winners in rugby in 2016. In 2017, the school won the district tennis championships. In 2019, St John's under 15 boys won the Hampshire rugby 7's plate and later that year the College won the South East Hampshire Schools Cricket championship (u/15).
 Richard Utley, former Hampshire cricketer who made his first-class debut in 1927

Academia
 Timothy C. Lethbridge, professor of computer science and software engineering at the University of Ottawa.
 William Swadling, Senior Law Fellow at Brasenose College, Oxford University and Reader in the Law of Property.
 Stephen Nokes, former grammar school headmaster, founder member of the Grammar School Heads Association
 Paul Haffner, adjunct professor Duquesne University and Seton Hall University, invited professor Pontifical Gregorian University
 Anthony Cusens, emeritus professor of civil engineering, University of Leeds
 Brian Burley, former professor of mineralogy McMaster University, Ontario

Forces
 Michael Willcocks, former Black Rod. Chief of Staff for the Allied Command Europe Rapid Reaction Corps, Chief of Staff for the Land Component of the Peace Implementation Force. UK military representative to NATO and the European Union from 2000 to 2001.
 Anthony Cleland Welch, UK-based former soldier, UN official, politician and academic, Deputy Chief of Staff of the 3rd (UK) Armoured Division, Deputy Chief of Staff (Land) during the first Gulf War
 Michael Heath, Special Adviser, US Central Command, d.2007
 Trevor Spraggs, Chief of Staff to Commander in Chief, Naval Home Command
 Louis Hargroves, first commanding officer and colonel of The Staffordshire Regiment, commander of the British garrison in Aden 1964–66, Deputy Lieutenant of Staffordshire, political fundraiser for Margaret Thatcher's government. (d.2008). 
 Arthur Webb, Chief Staff Officer to Fleet Commander, Flag Officer
 Ronald Gardner-Thorpe, Lord Mayor of London 1980, Aide-de-Camp to King Frederick of Denmark, was a British company director, Liberal Party politician. Chairman, Old Johannians, 1961, Founder of the Gardner-Thorpe Prize for French, Governor of St John's (1963) 
 Robert Cook, Signal Officer-in-Chief (Army), Director General, Federation of the Electronics Industry, Freeman of the City of London 
 Rodney Flynn, former sub treasurer of the Inner Temple, 1978
 Monty Carss
 Hugh 'Peggy' O'Neill, RAF. Brother of:
 Tony O'Neill, RAF, first British air attaché to the state of Israel (d. 2008)
 Jean E. François Demozay, Commandeur de la legion d'honneur, compagnon de la liberation (1915–1945), OJ −1931
 Raymond Powell, Old Johannian vice-chairman, d. 2000
 Steve Wood, Director of Military Intelligence, India 1947
 Denis O'Flaherty, High Commission Canada (OJ 1933–1939) d.1980
 Francis Downer, HMS Monserrat
 Paddy Doyle
 William (Walter) Ritchie, Chairman, Old Johannians, 1922 and 1930

SJC associates
 Neil Hamilton, between 1973 and 1976 a teacher at St John's College. Alleged 'cash for questions' MP, barrister, member of the Welsh Assembly and Deputy Chairman of the UK Independence Party (UKIP)
 Denis Daly, former governor of SJC, Lord Mayor of Portsmouth 1939–43, 1950, Deputy Lieutenant of Hampshire, Chevalier of the Legion of Honour; and Lady Margaret Daly, lord mayor and lady mayoress of Portsmouth during the Second World War. Parents of Denis Daly, OJ and Patrick Daly, OJ
 Fred Currey, RAF, chairman Old Johannian Association 1960, Alderman of the City of Portsmouth, pioneer of civil flying in Portsmouth 
 Clare W Jolliffe, accountant, chairman Old Johannian Association 1934, 1952, 1964, former Governor of St. Johns 
 Douglas Fairbanks Jr, visited and funded a balloon service hospital set up in SJC's Woodlands boarding house during WWII
 Eddie C Dyas, chairman Old Johannian Association 1939, 1954. Founder of the EC Dyas Memorial Prize for History, the EC Dyas Prize for History, the EC Dyas Middle School Award for History
 Michael Magan, chairman Old Johannian Association 1919, 1925, 1933, 1958. Author, 'Cradled in History: St. John's College, Southsea 1908–1976' 
 Sir Arthur Holbrook, MP for Basingstoke, head of Holbrook and Son Ltd, printers of St. John's Gazette for over 50 years and owner of Warleigh House before its sale to SJC in 1911

In film
 The Swallows and Amazons re-adaptation, starring Rafe Spall, with leading roles played by Old Johannians Dane Hughes as John Walker and Seren Hawkes as Nancy Blackett.
 The award-winning French coming of age film Me, Myself and Mum by Old Johannian Guillaume Gallienne featured in its publicity a variant of the college crest and uniform.

Headmasters of St John's College

All the Heads of College and former Brother-Directors of St John's College include:
 Mrs Mary Maguire, 2019–2022, acting Head 2018–2019, final head teacher 
 Mr Tim Bayley, 2016-2018
 Mr Graham Best, 2010–2016
 Mr N. Thorne, 2001-2010
 Mrs S. Bell, 1998-2001
 Mr G. Morgan, 1996-1998
 Mr J. Davies, 1994-1996
 Brother Cyril, 1983-1994
 Brother Benet, 1981-1983
 Brother Anthony, 1976-1981
 Brother Geoffrey, 1976-1977
 Brother Damian, 1969–1976
 Brother Swithun, 1963-1969
 Brother Edwin, 1957–1963
 Brother Alan Maurice, 1951–1957
 Brother Augustine, 1947-1951
 Brother Leo Barrington, 1944–1947 
 Brother David, 1937-1944
 Brother Celsus, 1935-1937
 Brother Simon 1918–1935, longest serving headmaster
 Brother Christantian 1914–1918, headmaster during the Great War
 Brother Firme of Quievy, 1908–1914, founding headmaster

References

External links

 
 Profile on the ISC website
 ISI Inspection Reports

Private schools in Portsmouth
Portsmouth
Boarding schools in Hampshire
Educational institutions established in 1908
1908 establishments in England
Catholic boarding schools in England